Casillas is a Spanish surname that may refer to

 Andrés Casillas de Alba (born 1934), Mexican architect
 Giovani Casillas (born 1994), Mexican association football player
 Graciela Casillas (born 1957), American boxer and kickboxer
 Hugo Casillas (born 1981), Mexican association football player
 Iker Casillas (born 1981), Spanish football goalkeeper
 Jesús Casillas Romero (born 1962), Mexican politician
 Luis Casíllas (1905–?), Mexican modern pentathlete
 Martín Casillas (1556–1618), Spanish architect
 Jonathan Casillas (born 1987), American football linebacker

 Susana Casillas, Mexican visual artist
 Toñín Casillas (born 1935), Puerto Rican basketball player
 Tony Casillas (born 1963), American football defensive lineman

Spanish-language surnames